Tiger Beat is an American teen fan magazine originally published by The Laufer Company and marketed primarily to adolescent girls. The magazine had a paper edition that was sold at stores until December 2018, and the magazine is now published exclusively online.

History and profile
Tiger Beat was founded in September 1965 by Charles "Chuck" Laufer, his brother Ira Laufer, and television producer and host Lloyd Thaxton. The magazine features teen idol gossip and carries articles on movies, music and fashion. Charles Laufer once described the magazine's content as "guys in their 20s singing 'La La' songs to 13-year-old girls."

A distinctive element of Tiger Beat is its covers, which feature cut-and-paste collaged photos – primarily head shots – of current teen idols. For the first twelve issues, Thaxton's face appeared at the top corner of the cover (at first the magazine was titled Lloyd Thaxton's Tiger Beat), and he also contributed a column. Post-2016, the magazine started using solo celebrities on their covers to target celeb-obsessed Gen Z-ers.

During the 1960s, The Laufer Company leveraged the teen market dominated by Tiger Beat with similar magazines, including FaVE and Monkee Spectacular. In 1998, Tiger Beat was sold by publisher Sterling/MacFadden to Primedia, which sold the magazine to Scott Laufer, Charles's son, in 2003. Until 2014, Laufer also produced the similar teen magazine Bop. Since 2015 Tiger Beat has been published by Los Angeles-based Tiger Beat Media, Inc.

In popular culture
Jude Doyle founded the blog Tiger Beatdown (a punning reference to Tiger Beat) in 2008. It concluded in 2013.

References

External links

Children's magazines published in the United States
Monthly magazines published in the United States
Celebrity magazines published in the United States
Defunct magazines published in the United States
Magazines established in 1965
Magazines disestablished in 2019
Magazines published in California
Teen magazines